This is a list of fine art universities and colleges in Europe, containing academic institutions of higher (tertiary) undergraduate education, postgraduate education and research, offering academic degrees of fine art (such as Bachelor of Fine Arts, Master of Fine Arts, and equivalent). The list makes no distinction between public or private institutions, or by institutions that focus solely on fine art or as part of a wider range of related or non-related subjects. However, it does exclude 1) institutions below higher (tertiary) education, and 2) academic institutions that focus solely on arts in the definition of design, and applied arts, etc.

Austria
Academy of Fine Arts Vienna, Vienna, 1692 - website
University of Art and Design Linz, Linz, 1947 - website
University of Applied Arts Vienna, Vienna, 1867 - website

Belgium
Royal Academy of Fine Arts (Antwerp), Antwerp, 1663 - website
Académie Royale des Beaux-Arts, Brussels, 1711
Royal Academy of Fine Arts (Ghent), Ghent, 1741 - website
LUCA School of Arts, Brussels, 1880
Institut Saint-Luc, Brussels, 1882
La Cambre, Brussels, 1926

Bosnia and Herzegovina
Academy of Performing Arts in Sarajevo, Sarajevo, 1981

Bulgaria
National Academy of Arts, Sofia, 1896

Croatia
Academy of Fine Arts, University of Zagreb, Zagreb, 1907

Cyprus
Cyprus College of Art, Larnaca, 1969

Czech Republic
Academy of Fine Arts, Prague, Prague, 1799 - website
Academy of Arts, Architecture and Design in Prague, Prague, 1885 - website
Prague City University, Prague, 2004 - 
Academy of Performing Arts in Prague, Prague, 1945- website
Faculty of Fine Arts, Brno, 1993 - website
Janáček Academy of Music and Performing Arts, Brno, 1947- website

Ladislav Sutnar Faculty of Design and Art, University of West Bohemia, Plzeň, 2013 - website
Faculty of Art and Design, Jan Evangelista Purkyně University in Ústí nad Labem, Ústí nad Labem, 2000 - website
Faculty of Arts and Architecture, Technical University of Liberec, Liberec, 1994- website
Prague School of Creative Communication, Prague, 2016 - website

Denmark
Royal Danish Academy of Fine Arts, Copenhagen, 1754
Funen Art Academy, Odense, 1944
Jutland Art Academy, Århus, 1959
The Classical Drawing School, Glyptoteket

Estonia
Estonian Academy of Arts, Tallinn, 1914
Tartu Art College, Karlova, 2000

Finland
University of the Arts Helsinki, Helsinki, 2013

France
École nationale supérieure des Beaux-Arts, Paris, 1682
École nationale supérieure d'art de Nancy, Nancy, 1702
Institut supérieur des arts de Toulouse, Toulouse, (1746?)
ESAD de Reims, Reims, 1748
École supérieure d'art et de design Marseille-Méditerranée, Marseille, 1752
École supérieure des beaux-arts de Tours, Tours, 1760
École supérieure d'art de Grenoble, Grenoble, 1762
École supérieure d'art d'Aix-en-Provence, Aix-en-Provence, 1765
École nationale supérieure d'art de Dijon, Dijon, 1765
École nationale supérieure des arts décoratifs, Paris, 1766
École nationale des beaux-arts de Lyon, Lyon, 1756
École supérieure des beaux-arts de Montpellier Méditerranée Métropole, Montpellier, (1779?)
École supérieure d'art et de design d'Orléans, Orléans, 1787
École régionale des beaux-arts de Rennes, Rennes, 1795
École supérieure d'art d'Avignon, Avignon, 1801
Haute École des arts du Rhin, Strasbourg, (1821?)
École nationale supérieure des arts appliqués et des métiers d'art, Paris, 1856
Villa Arson, Nice, 1881
École Boulle, Paris, 1886
École des beaux-arts de Bordeaux, Bordeaux, 1889
École supérieure des beaux-arts de Nantes Métropole, Nantes, 1904
 École nationale supérieure d'arts de Paris-Cergy (ENSAPC), 1975
Paris College of Art, Paris, 1981 - PCA website
Institut des Hautes Études en Arts Plastiques, Paris, 1985
Pont Aven School of Contemporary Art, Pont-Aven, 1993
European Academy of Art in Brittany (European University of Brittany), Rennes, 2010
Parsons Paris (2013) (Parsons School of Design), Paris, 2013- website

Germany
Academy of Fine Arts, Nuremberg, Nuremberg, 1662 - Akademie website
Berlin University of the Arts, Berlin, 1696 - UDK website
Burg Giebichenstein University of Art and Design, Halle (Saale), 1915 - University website
State Academy of Fine Arts in Stuttgart, Stuttgart, 1761 - Akademie website
Kunstakademie Düsseldorf, Düsseldorf, 1773 - Akademie website
Dresden Academy of Fine Arts, Dresden, 1764
Hochschule für Grafik und Buchkunst Leipzig, Leipzig, 1764
University of Fine Arts of Hamburg, Hamburg, 1767
Kunsthochschule Kassel, Kassel, 1777
Academy of Fine Arts, Munich, Munich, 1808 - Akademie website
Städelschule, Frankfurt, 1817
Hochschule für Gestaltung Offenbach am Main, Offenbach am Main, 1832
Academy of Fine Arts, Karlsruhe, Karlsruhe, 1854
Bauhaus University, Weimar, Weimar, 1860
University of the Arts Bremen, Bremen, 1873
Weißensee Academy of Art Berlin, Berlin, 1946
Braunschweig University of Art, Braunschweig, 1952

Greece
Athens School of Fine Arts, Athens, 1837
Aristotle University of Thessaloniki, Thessaloniki, 1925

Hungary
Moholy-Nagy University of Art and Design, Budapest, 1870
Hungarian University of Fine Arts, Budapest, 1871

Iceland
Iceland Academy of the Arts, Reykjavík, 1998

Ireland
National College of Art and Design, Dublin, 1746 - NCAD website
Limerick School of Art and Design, Limerick, 1852 Limerick School of Art website
Crawford College of Art and Design, Cork, 1974 - Crawford website
Dublin Institute of Technology, Dublin, 1992 - School of Art, Design & Printing website
Burren College of Art, Galway, 1993 - Burren College of Art website
Dún Laoghaire Institute of Art, Design and Technology, Dublin, 1997

Italy

State academies of fine art
 Accademia di Belle Arti di Firenze, Florence, 1563 - website
 Accademia di Belle Arti di Roma, Rome, latter part of the 16th century - website
 Accademia di Belle Arti di Torino "Albertina", Turin, 1678
 Accademia di Belle Arti di Venezia, Venice, 1750 - website
 Accademia di Belle Arti di Napoli, Naples, 1752 - website
 Accademia di Belle Arti di Milano "Brera", Milan, 1776 - website
 Accademia di Belle Arti di Carrara, Carrara, 1769
 Accademia di Belle Arti di Palermo, Palermo, 1780
 Accademia di Belle Arti di Bologna, Bologna, 1802 - website
 Accademia di Belle Arti di Lecce, Lecce, 1960
 Accademia di Belle Arti di Catania, Catania, 1967
 Accademia di Belle Arti di Reggio Calabria, Reggio Calabria, 1967
 Accademia di Belle Arti di Urbino, Urbino, 1967 - website
 Accademia di Belle Arti di L'Aquila, L'Aquila, 1969
 Accademia di Belle Arti di Bari, Bari, 1970
 Accademia di Belle Arti di Foggia, Foggia, 1970
 Accademia di Belle Arti di Catanzaro, Catanzaro, 1972
 Accademia di Belle Arti di Macerata, Macerata, 1972 - website
 Accademia di Belle Arti di Frosinone, Frosinone, 1973
 Accademia di Belle Arti di Sassari, Sassari, 1989

Other academies with state recognition
 Accademia di Belle Arti di Perugia, Perugia, 1573
 Accademia Ligustica di Belle Arti di Genova, Genoa, 1751
 Accademia di Belle Arti di Verona, Verona, 1764
 Accademia Carrara di Belle Arti di Bergamo, Bergamo, 1796
 Accademia di Belle Arti di Ravenna, Ravenna, 1827 - website
 Accademia di Belle Arti "Lorenzo da Viterbo", Viterbo, 1975 - website
 Accademia di belle arti Michelangelo, Agrigento, 1979 - website
 Nuova Accademia di Belle Arti, Milan, 1980
 Accademia di Belle Arti Aldo Galli di Como, Como, 1989 - website
 , Cuneo, 1992 - website
 , Syracuse, 1995 - website
 Accademia di Belle Arti di Sanremo, Sanremo, 1997 - website
 Accademia di Belle Arti "Fidia" di Stefanaconi, Stefanaconi, 1997 - website
 Accademia di Belle Arti "Rome University of Fine Arts" di Roma, Rome, 1998 - website
 Libera Accademia di Belle Arti LABA di Brescia, Brescia, 1999
 Accademia di Belle Arti Kandinskij di Trapani, Trapani, 1999 - website
 , Brescia, 2002 - website
 Accademia di Belle Arti Abadir di San Martino delle Scale, San Martino delle Scale - website
 Accademia di Belle Arti Abadir di Sant'Agata li Battiati, Sant'Agata li Battiati - website
 , Milan - website
 Accademia di Belle Arti Europea dei Media ACME di Novara, Novara - website
 Accademia di Belle Arti I. Repin a Firenze, Firenze - website

Latvia
 Art Academy of Latvia, Riga, 1921

Lithuania
 Vilnius Academy of Art, Vilnius, 1793

Netherlands
Royal Academy of Art, The Hague, The Hague, 1682 - KABK website
Willem de Kooning Academy (including Piet Zwart Institute), Rotterdam, 1773 - Willem de Kooning website
Academie Minerva, Groningen, 1798 - website
AKV St.Joost, Breda, Den Bosch, 1812 - website
Rijksakademie van beeldende kunsten, Amsterdam, 1870 - Rijksakademie website
Fontys School of the Fine and Performing Arts, Tilburg, 1912 - 
Gerrit Rietveld Academie, Amsterdam, 1924 - Gerrit Rielveld Academie website
Jan Van Eyck Academie, Maastricht, 1948 - Jan van Eyck Academie website
Amsterdam University of the Arts, Amsterdam, 1987
Maastricht Academy of Fine Arts, Maastricht, 1993
Frank Mohr Institute, Groningen, 1996 - FMI website
Artez, Arnhem, Enschede, and Zwolle, 2002 - ArtEZ website
Utrecht School of the Arts, Utrecht

Norway
Bergen Academy of Art and Design, Bergen, 1972/1909
Trondheim Academy of Fine Art, Trondheim, 1979
Oslo National Academy of the Arts, Oslo, 1996
Tromsø Academy of fine Art, Tromsø, 1997

Poland
Jan Matejko Academy of Fine Arts, Kraków, 1818 - website
University of Fine Arts in Poznań, Poznań, 1919
Academy of Fine Arts in Warsaw, Warsaw, 1932
Academy of Fine Arts In Łódź, Łódź, 1945

Portugal
Colégio das Artes (University of Coimbra), Coimbra, (1542?)
University of Porto, Porto, 1911 - website
University of Lisbon, Lisbon, 1911 - website

Romania
George Enescu University of Arts of Iași, Iași, 1864
Bucharest National University of Arts, Bucharest, 1948
Art and Design University of Cluj-Napoca, Cluj-Napoca, 1925

Russia
Russian Academy of Arts, Moscow, 1757
British Higher School of Art& Design, Moscow, 2015

Serbia
 University of Arts in Belgrade#Faculty of Fine Arts, Belgrade, 1937

Slovakia
Academy of Fine Arts and Design, Bratislava, Bratislava, 1949 VSVU website

Slovenia
Academy of Fine Arts and Design (University of Ljubljana), Ljubljana, (1919?)

Spain
 Real Academia de Bellas Artes de San Fernando, Madrid, 1744
 Real Academia de Bellas Artes de San Carlos de Valencia, Valencia, 1768
 Reial Acadèmia Catalana de Belles Arts de Sant Jordi, Barcelona, 1775

Sweden
Royal Institute of Art, Stockholm, 1735 - http://www.kkh.se/en
University College of Arts, Crafts and Design, Stockholm, 1844 - https://www.konstfack.se/en
Valand Academy, Gothenburg, 1865 - http://akademinvaland.gu.se/english
Malmö Art Academy, Malmö, 1965 - http://www.khm.lu.se/en
Academy of Fine Arts, Umeå, Umeå, 1987 - http://www.art.umu.se/en

Switzerland
École cantonale d'art de Lausanne, Lausanne, 1821
Zurich University of the Arts, Zurich, 1878/2007

United Kingdom

England
Royal Academy of Arts, London, 1768 - Royal Academy website
Royal College of Art, London, 1837 - RCA website
Manchester School of Art, Manchester, 1838
Leeds Arts University, Leeds 1846
Hereford College of Arts, West Midlands, 1851
Bath School of Art and Design, Bath, 1852
Central Saint Martins (University of the Arts London), London, 1854 - St Martins College website
City and Guilds of London Art School, London, 1854
Arts University Plymouth, Plymouth, 1856
Slade School of Art, London, 1871 - Slade website
Ruskin School of Drawing and Fine Art (University of Oxford), Oxford, 1871
Arts University Bournemouth, Poole, 1880 - The Arts Institute at Bournemouth website
Wimbledon College of Art (University of the Arts London), London, 1890 - Wimbledon College website
Goldsmiths College, London, 1891 - Goldsmiths website
London College of Communication (University of the Arts London), London, 1894 - LCC website
Camberwell College of Arts (University of the Arts London), London, 1898 - Camberwell College website
Falmouth University, Falmouth, Cornwall, 1902
University of Leeds, Leeds, 1904
Chelsea College of Arts (University of the Arts London), London, 1908 - Chelsea College website
Liverpool College of Art, Liverpool, 1910

Northern Ireland
Belfast School of Art, Belfast, 1849

Scotland
Edinburgh College of Art, Edinburgh, 1760 - ECA website
Glasgow School of Art, Glasgow, 1845 - GSA website
Gray's School of Art, Aberdeen, 1885
Duncan of Jordanstone College of Art and Design, Dundee, 1888 - DJCAD website
Leith School of Art, Edinburgh, 1987

Wales
Cardiff School of Art & Design, Cardiff, 1865
Royal Cambrian Academy of Art, Conwy, 1881

See also
Art school
Art education
List of art schools in Europe

Notes

Europe